Pedicularis canadensis, commonly called Canadian lousewort or wood betony, is a flowering plant in the family Orobanchaceae. It is native to North America, where it is found in southeastern Canada, the eastern United States, and eastern Mexico. It has a wide-ranging natural habitat, being found in mesic to dry, forests, woodlands, and prairies.

Description
It blooms in the spring to summer, between April and June. It produces a broad whorl of tubular, hooded flowers on top of a segmented stalk. The flowers range in color from a greenish-yellow to purplish-red, clustered on short, dense spikes. They are pollinated by bumblebees. The fruit is a long brown seed capsule, which disperses through explosive dehiscence.

Taxonomy
The genus name Pedicularis is from Latin meaning "of or relating to lice", from the belief that cows caught lice when grazing in pastures with the European Pedicularis palustris. The specific epithet canadensis refers to Canada. It was formerly included in the family Scrophulariaceae but is now considered to be in Orobanchaceae.

Two subspecies are accepted:
 Pedicularis canadensis subsp. canadensis — broadly distributed
 Pedicularis canadensis subsp. fluviatilis (A.Heller) W.A.Weber — restricted to northern New Mexico and Colorado

Distribution and habitat
Wood betony is broadly distributed across eastern North America, from Quebec west to Manitoba, south to Mexico, and east to Florida. It occurs in a variety of habitats, including mesic to dry prairies, savannas, barrens, and woodlands. In the Chicago area it is considered a conservative species, with a coefficient of conservatism of 9.

Ecology
Pedicularis canadensis is a hemiparasite, attaching to the roots of diverse species, but also producing chlorophyll on its own. Its roots also have a symbiotic relationship with a fungus that helps it gather nutrients. It has been used in prairie restoration projects to reduce the dominance of aggressive tallgrasses.

A leaf beetle, Capraita circumdata has been collected from inside of the flowers. Several ants have been recorded visiting the flowers, including: Crematogaster cerasi, Formica incerta, Formica subsericea, and Lasius alienus. Bees documented visiting the flowers of wood betony include Augochlorella aurata, Bombus auricomus, Bombus bimaculatus, Bombus fervidus, Bombus griseocollis, Bombus impatiens, Bombus vagans, Halictus  confusus, and Lasioglossum anomalum.

Uses
This plant was eaten by the Iroquois as a vegetable, often as a soup. It was added to oats and used as horse feed by Native Americans.

American Indians used a root infusion as a remedy for stomachaches, diarrhea, anemia and heart trouble and made a poultice for swellings, tumors and sore muscles.

Folklore
The Menomini called the root "enticer root" and carried it as a charm when determined on seducing the opposite sex. The root was also used to heal broken marriages by placing it in food the couple would both eat, hoping its magic would rekindle romance.

References

canadensis
Flora of North America
Plants used in traditional Native American medicine